Félix Suárez (6 December 1950 – 3 September 2020) was a Spanish racing cyclist. He competed in the sprint event at the 1972 Summer Olympics.

References

External links
 

1950 births
2020 deaths
Spanish male cyclists
Olympic cyclists of Spain
Cyclists at the 1972 Summer Olympics
Sportspeople from the Province of Valladolid
Cyclists from Castile and León